The 1993–94 Australian Baseball League Championship was won by the Brisbane Bandits who after finishing 3rd defeated Perth Heat to meet the Sydney Blues in the championship series where they won the Championship in 2 games.

Ladder

Championship series

Semi Final 1: Game 1: 1st Vs 4th at Parramatta Stadium
11 February 1994

Semi Final 1: Game 2: 1st Vs 4th at Parramatta Stadium

Semi Final 2: Game 1: 2nd Vs 3rd at Parry Field

Semi Final 2: Game 2: 2nd Vs 3rd at Parry Field

Semi Final 2: Game 3: 2nd Vs 3rd at Parry Field

Final Series: Game 1: Winner Semi Final 1 Vs Winner Semi Final 2 at Parramatta Stadium

Final Series: Game 2: Winner Semi Final 1 Vs Winner Semi Final 2 at Parramatta Stadium

Awards

Top Stats

All-Star Team

References

Australian Baseball League (1989–1999) seasons
1993 in Australian baseball
1994 in Australian baseball